This is a list of cities, towns and villages in the province of North Brabant, in the Netherlands.

References 
 GEOnet Names Server (GNS)
 :nl:ANWB (Dutch)
 VUGA's Alfabetische Plaatsnamengids van Nederland, 1997.

External links 

 
North Brabant